Ruth is an unincorporated community in Kanawha County, West Virginia, United States.

References

Unincorporated communities in Kanawha County, West Virginia
Unincorporated communities in West Virginia